was a private university in Akashi, Hyōgo, Japan.

History 
The school was founded in 1937 as Kobe Dressmaker Jogakuin (jogakuin means "women's academy"). In 1967 the school foundation established Akashi Women's Junior College, which became coeducational in 1969 and was renamed Akashi Junior College (After the Michiyo Okabe nude murder case, it was renamed Kobe College of Liberal Arts in 1990). In 2005 a part of the junior college was reorganized into Kobe University of Fashion and Design. In 2010 the university announced that it stopped admitting students and that it would be closed in March 2013.

Organization

Undergraduate schools 
 Faculty of Fashion and Design

Affiliated schools 
 Kobe College of Fashion and Design (a junior college, formerly Kobe College of Liberal Arts)
 Kobe Fashion Institute (a technical college in Chūō-ku, Kobe)

References

External links 
 Official website 

Educational institutions established in 1937
Universities and colleges in Hyōgo Prefecture
Fashion schools
1937 establishments in Japan
Defunct private universities and colleges in Japan
Japanese fashion